Aikatsu Friends! is a Japanese anime television series produced by BN Pictures, and the successor to both the Aikatsu Stars! series and the original Aikatsu! anime series based on Bandai's Data Carddass arcade machines. The series began airing on TV Tokyo from April 5, 2018 to September 26, 2019, succeeding the Aikatsu Stars! anime series in its initial timeslot. From episode 26 until episode 50 the opening theme is "What is Only There" (そこにしかないもの Soko ni Shikanai Mono) by Aine and Mio. The ending  theme from episode 26 until episode 50 is "Pride" (プライド Puraido) by Karen and Mirai. Since episode 51, the opening theme is "Not Alone! (ひとりじゃない！ Hitori ja nai!)" by Aine, Mio, Maika and Ema while the ending theme is "Be star" by Hibiki from BEST FRIENDS!.

Episode list

Season 1

Season 2

References

Aikatsu Friends!
Aikatsu!